She Wants Revenge is an American rock band, based in San Fernando Valley, California. Formed in 2004, the band is a duo of singer and guitarist Justin Warfield and multi-instrumentalist Adam Bravin. Their music has been influenced by post-punk, darkwave and gothic rock. The band has sold more than 300,000 records in the US. 

The group's debut album She Wants Revenge was released in early 2006 and included the singles "Tear You Apart" (the band's biggest hit, reaching No. 6 on Billboard's Alternative Songs chart), "These Things" and "Out of Control". The band also released the albums This Is Forever (2007) and Valleyheart (2011) before disbanding in 2012. She Wants Revenge has since reunited twice, in 2015 and in 2022.

History
She Wants Revenge, a duo consisting of Justin Warfield and Adam Bravin, formed in 2004. Warfield was formerly a rapper whose 1991 single "Season of the Vic" reached No. 18 on Billboard's Hot Rap Singles chart and was featured on Bomb the Bass' song "Bug Powder Dust", a No. 24 hit in the UK. Bravin was a DJ under the name DJ Adam 12 and played for Crazy Town from 1995 to 1996.

The group's self-titled debut was released on January 31, 2006. Lead single "These Things" starred Garbage singer Shirley Manson in its music video, while Joaquin Phoenix directed the video for second single "Tear You Apart".

The band toured extensively through 2006 with Depeche Mode and Placebo.

In 2007, the group was featured on the track "Time" with Timbaland. In a recent interview, Adam Bravin told Suicide Girls that She Wants Revenge has a lot of unreleased potential b-sides, like "Love to Sleep", which they would like to share. Adam added that the band would like to tour with their heroes The Cure and Bauhaus and in 2011 they did tour with Peter Murphy, lead singer of Bauhaus, on his "Ninth" tour in the US. 
They were released from their contract with the label Geffen/Interscope, according to a MySpace bulletin. The group formed their own label, Perfect Kiss, formerly an imprint, in 2008.

Their EP, Save Your Soul, was released to iTunes on May 13, 2008. The EP contained four tracks: "Save Your Soul", "A Hundred Kisses", "Sugar", and "Sleep". The group has formed a fan club and participated in the 2008 Nylon summer tour. Their song "Tear You Apart" appeared in the first season of the TV show Fringe (episode 18, "Midnight"), in the movie The Number 23 starring Jim Carrey, and in the season 5 première of American Horror Story (episode 1, "Checking In").

An EP titled Up and Down, was released via iTunes on September 22, 2009. At the end of their tour to promote the release of Up and Down, She Wants Revenge began working on their third studio album, which would revisit the dark roots of their first album.

A new video titled "Take The World" was released February 7, 2011, prior to the release of their first single, "Must Be The One". The video was band member Adam Bravin's directorial debut. Filming for "Must Be The One" began on February 8, and was released in March. Valleyheart, the band's third studio album, was released on May 23, 2011.

On August 1, 2012, the band announced that they are taking an indefinite hiatus.

In 2015, She Wants Revenge gained popularity following "Tear You Apart" appearing in American Horror Story: Hotels season premiere. The song choice was personally requested by Lady Gaga, who starred in the show. As a result, the band reunited, selling out its ten-year anniversary reunion shows.

On 22 February 2019, it was announced that She Wants Revenge would be appearing at Infest Festival, held at the University of Bradford Student Union, West Yorkshire, UK, over the August Bank Holiday Weekend.

In August 2020, the band announced that they were disbanding.
In May 2022, the band announced that they are recording again and intend to begin touring in the near future. They announced a USA fall 2022 tour, supported by the Chameleons, and a European tour.

Band members

Lead members
Justin Warfield – lead vocals, guitars, keyboards
Adam Bravin  – bass, keyboards, guitars, drum machine, percussion, programming, backing vocals

Touring members
Thomas Froggatt – guitars
David Goodstein — drums
Scott Ellis – drums, percussion, tour manager
Jason Payne – drums

Discography

Studio albums

EPs

Singles

Notes

Compilations
The Nightmare Before Christmas Soundtrack – (October 2006; contributed "Kidnap the Sandy Claws")
Timbaland Presents: Shock Value – (April 3, 2007; contributed "Time")

References

External links

Voodoo Tonic - Interview With The Voodoo - New Models & Great Bands

Electronic music duos
American dark wave musical groups
Musical groups established in 2004
Post-punk revival music groups
Alternative rock groups from California
American gothic rock groups
Indie rock musical groups from California
Musical groups from Los Angeles
Musical groups disestablished in 2020
Musical groups reestablished in 2022